Halvarsgårdarna is a locality situated in Borlänge Municipality, Dalarna County, Sweden with 325 inhabitants in 2010.

References 

Populated places in Dalarna County
Populated places in Borlänge Municipality